Gloria Lindsay Luby is a Canadian former politician. Luby was a Toronto city councillor and former Deputy Speaker of Toronto City Council in Toronto, Ontario, Canada for Ward 4 Etobicoke Centre. She represented one of the two Etobicoke Centre wards.  Lindsay Luby is also a former chair of the Government Management Committee.

Career
She was a successful businesswoman and consultant before entering politics. She first served as a trustee on the Etobicoke school board, and then became an Etobicoke city councillor. When Etobicoke was merged with the City of Toronto and four other municipalities in 1997, she was elected to the Toronto City Council. She was a member of the Toronto Police Services Board for the period December 2000-December 4, 2003. She served as acting chair of the Toronto Police Services Board during the period June–November 2013 after Norm Gardner stepped aside as board chair. Luby also served as  chair of the Economic Development and Parks Committee.

A member of the Ontario Progressive Conservative Party, she publicly mused about running in the 2003 provincial election to replace Chris Stockwell as the local Member of Provincial Parliament, and was courted by PC leader Premier Ernie Eves.

Family

Lindsay Luby's education includes an honours degree from the University of Western Ontario and a Master of Education degree from the University of Toronto. She and her husband have three children. She is of Ukrainian heritage.

Resignation
On September 28, 2009, Lindsay Luby resigned from the executive committee claiming that she felt marginalized and didn't agree with Toronto Mayor Miller's agenda. She said, "I never felt part of that small inner circle" referring to other members of the executive committee who had closer ties to the mayor. She denied that her resignation had anything to do with Miller's recent announcement to not seek a third term as mayor. "I was reluctant to take this step while all the attention was focused on the mayor's re-election prospects," she said.

On August 28, 2014, Lindsay Luby announced that she would not seek re-election for her ward.

Election results

References

External links

Businesspeople from Toronto
Toronto city councillors
People from Etobicoke
University of Western Ontario alumni
University of Toronto alumni
Canadian people of Ukrainian descent
Women municipal councillors in Canada
Living people
Women in Ontario politics
Year of birth missing (living people)